Dance! may refer to:

Dance! (Lumidee and Fatman Scoop song), 2006 song included on the album FIFA World Cup 2006 Soundtrack featuring R&B artist Lumidee and Fatman Scoop 
Dance! La Fuerza del Corazón, 2011 Uruguayan telenovela, widely known by the shortened title Dance!

See also
Dance (disambiguation)